Pseuderucaria is a genus of flowering plants belonging to the family Brassicaceae.

Its native range is Southern and Eastern Mediterranean.

Species:

Pseuderucaria clavata 
Pseuderucaria teretifolia

References

Brassicaceae
Brassicaceae genera